The 1972 ISF Men's World Championship was an international softball tournament. The tournament was held at the Rodriguez Sports Center in Marikina, Rizal, Philippines. It was the 3rd time the World Championship took place and the first time the Philippines to host the tournament. Ten nations competed, including defending champions United States.

Final standings

References

ISF Men's World Championship
1972 ISF Men's World Championship
Sports in Metro Manila
1972 in Philippine sport
Men's Softball World Championship
21st century in Manila